is a passenger railway station in the city of Maebashi, Gunma Prefecture, Japan, operated by East Japan Railway Company (JR East).

Lines
Shin-Maebashi Station is served by the Ryōmō Line, and is located 84.4 rail kilometers from the terminus of the line at Oyama Station. It is also served by the Jōetsu Line and is 7.3 kilometers from Takasaki Station.  Trains of the Agatsuma Line, which nominally terminates at  normally continue on to terminate at Shin-Maebashi.

Station layout

Shin-Maebashi Station has two elevated island platforms serving four tracks, with the station building underneath. The station has a Midori no Madoguchi ticket office.

Platforms

History
Shin-Maebashi Station was opened on 1 July 1921. The station was absorbed into the JR East network upon the privatization of the Japanese National Railways (JNR) on 1 April 1987.

Passenger statistics
In fiscal 2019, the station was used by an average of 6160 passengers daily (boarding passengers only).passengers daily (boarding passengers only).

Surrounding area
Jōmō Shimbun head office

See also
 List of railway stations in Japan

References

External links

   JR East Station information 

Railway stations in Gunma Prefecture
Ryōmō Line
Jōetsu Line
Agatsuma Line
Stations of East Japan Railway Company
Railway stations in Japan opened in 1921
Maebashi